Bethlehem Missionary Baptist Church was located south of Tallahassee, Florida in the unincorporated community of Belair and was moved to the Tallahassee Museum as one of its historical buildings.

The church was founded by James Page in 1851 on cotton plantation property given to him by John Parkhill, his owner. Bethlehem Missionary was the first regularly organized black church in Florida according to the museum and was restored by Florida A & M University.

References 

Baptist churches in Florida
History of Leon County, Florida
Churches in Leon County, Florida
1851 establishments in Florida
Churches completed in 1851